Aldehyde dehydrogenase X, mitochondrial is an enzyme that in humans is encoded by the ALDH1B1 gene.

Function 

This protein belongs to the aldehyde dehydrogenases family of proteins. Aldehyde dehydrogenase is the second enzyme of the major oxidative pathway of alcohol metabolism. This gene does not contain introns in the coding sequence. The variation of this locus may affect the development of alcohol-related problems.

Model organisms
Model organisms have been used in the study of ALDH1B1 function. A conditional knockout mouse line called Aldh1b1tm2a(EUCOMM)Wtsi was generated at the Wellcome Trust Sanger Institute. Male and female animals underwent a standardized phenotypic screen to determine the effects of deletion. Additional screens performed:  - In-depth immunological phenotyping - in-depth bone and cartilage phenotyping

References

External links

Further reading